2-nitroimidazole nitrohydrolase (NnhA, 2NI nitrohydrolase, 2NI denitrase) is an enzyme with systematic name 2-nitroimidazole nitrohydrolase. This enzyme catalyses the following chemical reaction

 2-nitroimidazole + H2O  imidazol-2-one + nitrite

This enzyme is present in the soil bacterium Mycobacterium sp. JS330

References

External links 
 

EC 3.5.99